is an airport located on the island of Yakushima in Kumage District, Kagoshima Prefecture, Japan.

History 
The airport was opened in 1963 with an 1100-meter runway. The runway was extended to 1200 meters in 1975 and to 1500 meters in 1976. The runway was hardened in 2004 so as to allow DHC-8-400 aircraft to operate.

A further extension to 2000m has been approved, which will allow jet aircraft to operate. The master plan and environmental assessment for the extension are to be prepared in 2023.

Facilities 
The airport has a single terminal building with apron parking for two propeller aircraft. It is operational from 8:30 to 19:30 daily.

Airlines and destinations

References

External links
 Yakushima Airport Guide Japan Airlines

Airports in Kagoshima Prefecture
Airports established in 1963
1963 establishments in Japan